Robert Cailliau (born 26 January 1947) is a Belgian informatics engineer, computer scientist and author who proposed the first (pre-www) hypertext system for CERN in 1987 and collaborated with Tim Berners-Lee on the World Wide Web (jointly winning the ACM Software System Award) from before it got its name. He designed the historical logo of the WWW, organized the first International World Wide Web Conference at CERN in 1994 and helped transfer Web development from CERN to the global Web consortium in 1995. Together with Dr. James Gillies, Cailliau wrote How the Web Was Born, the first book-length account of the origins of the World Wide Web.

Biography
Cailliau was born in Tongeren, Belgium. In 1958 he moved with his parents to Antwerp. After secondary school he graduated from Ghent University in 1969 as civil engineer in electrical and mechanical engineering (Dutch: Burgerlijk Werktuigkundig en Elektrotechnisch ingenieur). He also has an MSc from the University of Michigan in Computer, Information and Control Engineering, 1971.

During his military service in the Belgian Army, he maintained Fortran programs to simulate troop movements and test video war games.

In December 1974 he started working at CERN as a Fellow in the Proton Synchrotron (PS) division, working on the control system of the accelerator. In April 1987 he left the PS division to become group leader of Office Computing Systems in the Data Handling division. In 1989, Tim Berners-Lee proposed a hypertext system for access to the many forms of documentation at and related to CERN. Berners-Lee created the system, calling it World Wide Web, between September and December 1990. During this time, Cailliau and he co-authored a proposal for funding for the project. Cailliau later became a key proponent of the project, running several projects to create and support browsers on different operating systems including various UNIX flavours and Classic Mac OS. With Nicola Pellow he helped develop the first web browser for the Classic Mac OS operating system called MacWWW.

In 1993, in collaboration with the Fraunhofer-Gesellschaft Cailliau started the European Commission's first web-based project for information dissemination in Europe (WISE). As a result of his work with CERN's Legal Service, CERN's director of Future Research Walter Hoogland signed the official document that released the web technology into the public domain on 30 April 1993.

In December 1993 Cailliau called for the first International WWW Conference which was held at CERN in May 1994. The oversubscribed conference brought together 380 web pioneers and was a milestone in the development of the web. The conference led to the forming of the International World Wide Web Conferences Steering Committee which has organized an annual conference since then. Cailliau was a member of the committee from 1994 until 2002.

In 1995 Cailliau started the "Web for Schools" project with the European Commission, introducing the web as a resource for education. After helping to transfer the web development from CERN to the World Wide Web Consortium (W3C), he devoted his time to public communication. He went on early retirement from CERN in January 2007.

Cailliau is now an active member of Newropeans, a pan-European political movement for which he and Luca Cominassi have recently drafted a proposal concerning the European information society.

He is a public speaker on the past and future of the World Wide Web and has delivered many keynote speeches at international conferences.

Awards
1995: ACM Software System Award (with Tim Berners-Lee)
1999: Christophe Plantin Prize, Antwerp
1999: Dr. Hon. Southern Cross University
2000: Dr. Hon. University of Ghent
2001: Médaille Genève Reconnaissante (with Tim Berners-Lee)
2004: Commander in the Order of King Leopold (awarded by King Albert II of Belgium)
2006: Honorary citizenship of the city of Tongeren
2008: Gold Medal of the Flemish Academy of Sciences and the Arts
2009: Dr. Hon. University of Liège (with Tim Berners-Lee)
2010: Ehrenpreis Best of Swiss Web
2012: Internet Hall of Fame by the Internet Society
2021: Dr. Hon. from the University of Michigan for his co-creation (as cited by the ACM in its 1995 award to Dr. Cailliau) of the World-Wide-Web

See also 
 History of the World Wide Web

Bibliography

 How the Web Was Born (Oxford University Press)
 Publications in DBLP Computer Science Library

References

External links
First International Conference on the World-Wide Web
First International Conference on the World-Wide Web announcement
International World Wide Web Conference Committee
An interview with Cailliau in 1997

1947 births
Living people
People from Tongeren
20th-century Belgian inventors
Belgian computer programmers
People associated with CERN
Web developers
Belgian technology writers
University of Michigan College of Engineering alumni
Ghent University alumni
Internet pioneers